Ivan Durrant is an Australian painter, performance artist and writer. Known for creating art with "great shock value", such as the 1975 "Slaughtered Cow Happening" outside the National Gallery of Victoria, Durrant is often described as the enfant terrible of Australian art. The larger proportion of Durrant's work consists of paintings using a self-developed style of "Super-Realism".

Durrant now resides in Blairgowrie, Victoria, and his works are held in many public collections.

Early years 
Born in Melbourne in 1947, Ivan Durrant was one of seven children. His father suffered from alcoholism, a factor leading to the decision by Ivan's 22-year-old mother to place the children into state care. From ages seven through 15, Durrant was raised in an orphanage in Brighton, Victoria. He was dealt regular beatings, and suffered emotional abuse  - "even medical experimentation. He can remember being injected with all sorts of things, even when he wasn't sick".  Whilst still alive, neither of Durrant's parents ever visited their children in the orphanage. During those years, Durrant spent his summers on farms where he was billeted to work for the summers.  It was during that period that Durrant realise his fondness for birds and animals  Durrant says that he has "always had a love of looking at the structure of animals".

Ivan began drawing during his years at the orphanage, with his art providing some social advantage for him. "The 16-year old senior boys, they would look after me and I wouldn't be bullied because I could do drawings in their books for them, so art became my thing". Durrant's ability to draw developed into an interest in painting during his teenage years.

Georges Mora, of Tolarno Galleries, St Kilda was among the first to see potential in Durrant's work, giving him $300 in cash to buy paints, and his first exhibition in 1970.

Career

Technique 

Durrant's painting technique began in a childlike, folksy, naïve art  style, evolving into paintings of extreme Photorealism, which has come to be referred to "supraphotolism" (meaning to work 'above and beyond the photo'), and sculptures of illusionistic still-lives of butchered meats, pigs’ heads and all. 
Durrant spent a short time working in a prosthetics laboratory at Royal Melbourne Hospital and was able to create lifelike body parts. This skill was carried over into an ability to create convincingly accurate sculptures of ears, hands, pig heads and various cuts of meat.
Durrant's most recent works explore the colours and action of Australian Rules football.
His work has ranged from paintings to photography, public performance and installation art, short films and sculpture.

Artistic periods and themes 
1968 - 1970: Farm Life
1970-1972: Flinders Horses and Landscapes - reflections of the period during which Durrant lived in the coastal town of Flinders, Victoria.
1973: Unreal Realism - first movement into Realism (arts)
1974: Movie stars period
1975: Jockeys - First Photorealism show
1976: New York - Awarded Art Council of Australia Artist in Residence, New York City
1978: Butcher shop and Pigs Heads Exhibition - Beginnings of Meat period
1979: Meat Paintings
1981: Meat Paintings, Hawthorn Art Gallery - Photographic Exhibition of Meat
1982: Hamilton - Travelling Exhibition of Meat Paintings; United Artists Gallery Beginnings - more meat paintings
1984: United Artists Gallery - Fuck Art Period: Graffiti photographs of Pine Gap and Meat - response to changes in Uranium Policy. Included Uranium, you're standing in it exhibition.
1986: United Artists Gallery - Chernobyl Deformities Exhibition - Deformed babies theme
1988: United Artists Gallery & Regional Gallery Tour - Interiors of Sheds
1992: Westpac Gallery - Retrospective Exhibition 
1994: Survey of 70s Racing Paintings
1995:  Australia Felix Arts Festival, Benalla and Sheds
2002 - 2005: Cows
2007–present: Boundary Rider

Art happenings

Beverley The Amazing Performing Cow - The Slaughtered Cow happening 

Durrant is renowned for confronting the public through film, sculpture, performance exhibitions, and social realist paintings of the 1970s and 1980s. Much of his work has been based on concepts relating to socio-political themes; for example animal rights or the social effects of war. "A lot of his art did have a great shock value". 
On 26 May 1975, Durrant dumped  the carcass of a "freshly slaughtered cow" on the forecourt of the National Gallery of Victoria. In an interview with ABC Online, Durrant's daughter says that installations and performance art were still a very new form of artistic expression, and "to have something as extreme as an animal carcass put at the National Gallery of Victoria was just totally shocking to people".

Prior to the event, Durrant had discussed with close friend and mentor, abstractionist artist Asher Bilu, the concept of 'a more confrontational art 'happening' - to kill a cow before an audience'.  'The concept included actively drawing in the mass media to cover the event, thereby pushing it beyond the realm of high art'. Initially, the event was to take place at the Alexander Theatre, at Monash University. The public was to be the unwitting audience to the slaughtering of a cow named Beverley. The performance was described in a flyer as 'a real cow actually performing on stage'.

The event was leaked to the press on 23 May 1975, and was front-page news the following day. As a result, Monash University banned the event, and 'the media were on alert'. On the morning of 26 May 1975, Beverley was slaughtered in a cattle yard in Wheelers Hill, 'not far from where the Monash Gallery of Art stands today,' was then 'loaded onto a utility van, and with news crew in tow' was driven to the NGV, her carcass dumped in the forecourt.

The media coverage of the event was the most significant aspect of the performance, for 'in order to make a real impact, something about the performance needed to be identified (if not accepted) as art'. Durrant informed the staff at the NGV front desk that he was donating a sculpture, and 'asked whether they would consider leaving it in place for a few days'. The performance coincided with the opening of the gallery's 'first blockbuster exhibition, 'Modern Masters: Manet to Matisse', which was opening that night'. The NGV arranged for the carcass to be promptly removed and the site thoroughly cleaned before 'the scrum of Melbourne's social elite arrived'.

The happening was aired on the evening news nationwide, and made newspaper headlines the following day. The public response was 'one of outrage and disgust' and the art world was outraged at the claim that 'the cow was "art"'. Durrant was charged with 'depositing litter - to wit a dead cow', with Durrant pleading not guilty 'on the basis that Beverley was not litter. Durrant was fined $100, with the magistrate describing the event as 'an act of ego'.

The event was, in part, a statement about societal "failure to confront the reality of killing ... in contemporary society in the West".

The event was later interpreted as "a response to the life-wasting Vietnam War, but particularly the direct connection between life and death. Each of us, he argued, must ‘take responsibility for [their] own actions. If we are going to eat meat a cow dies for that. And we have to face it.'". Durrant's daughter states that she once considered such an interpretation (in relation to the Vietnam War) "a bit of a retrospectively applied stretch," but adds that "the cow endures as a metaphor for the inhumanity and carelessness with which we treat life generally and the extent to which we can become complacent and inured to this. Mass public outrage at a cow being slaughtered on the 6p.m. news threw into stark relief our preparedness to overlook far worse horrors.".

The Severed Hand happening 
Similar controversy surrounded Durrant's works of sculptural realism. An exhibition of what appeared to be a severed hand at Hogarth Galleries in Sydney received wide press coverage, leaving Sydney in "an uproar". The hand was, in fact, an intricately detailed synthetic polymer resin sculpture.

1976 - "Chopping Block" 16mm filmed pigeon dinner event 
Twelve guests were invited to a last supper at Durrant's Brighton home where they learned at the table that they were to prepare their own dinner - Durrant's pigeons. Guests were told that if they wished to eat, they had to slaughter their own pigeon at the table. This event, like other similar happenings demonstrated the point that "as humans we tend to dissociate animals from the whole process of killing". A film was made of the event, which was shown at the Dendy Cinema, Brighton; White Street Theatre, New York in 1976; and also at the Museum of Modern Art, New York in 1976.

Selected exhibitions and prizes

Awards and honours 

Sourced from 
and

Public collections 

Durrant's work is held in the following public collections:

The National Gallery of Australia, Canberra
National Gallery of Victoria
The Art Gallery of South Australia
The Art Gallery of Western Australian
Queensland University
Rockhampton Art Gallery, Queensland
Geelong Art Gallery, Victoria
Gippsland Art Gallery, Victoria
Latrobe Regional Gallery, Victoria
Caulfield Arts Complex, Victoria
Benalla Art Gallery, Victoria
The Art Gallery of Ballarat
Hamilton Art Gallery, Victoria
Bendigo Gallery, Victoria
Horsham Art Gallery, Victoria
ICI Corporate Collection
NAB Collection
British Museum Department of Prints and Drawings
Mornington Peninsula Regional Gallery, Victoria

Other work

Films 

1975 - Mad Dog Morgan, Special effects
1976 - Chopping Block: 16mm, pigeon dinner event, MOMA & White Street Theatre, New York
1977 - Long Weekend, Special effects; -Red Dog, 16mm, Alpine Dingoes
1980 - Self Portrait Blood Red, Meat Landscape, Awarded Best Experimental Film, Australian Film Institute Awards
1983 - Horse, 16mm, surreal dream

Autobiography 
The Insiders - A reflection of childhood days spent at orphanages and farm stays. 
All characters created by Ivan Durrant : Published by Bent Records, Copyright 1995, Benalla, Vic.

Australia Felix Arts Festival, Benalla, 1995 
To date, the festival remains the largest coming together of artists, poets, and writers in Australia. The festival was a two-week-long event, with 120 exhibiting and visiting artists; and 40 performing poets.

Essentials Magazine
Ivan Durrant is a regular contributor to Essentials Magazine, a Victorian High Country magazine dedicated to culture, culinary and adventure content.

Publications

Personal life 
Resides in Blairgowrie, Victoria
Married to Judy Durrant
Children: Jacqui Durrant; Jamie Durrant 
Grandchildren: Sacha Verrocchio, Elisey Durrant, Yaroslav Melikhov (step-grandchild)

Breeds and races pigeons.
Breeds cattle.
Worked in an abattoir to put himself through matriculation.
In 1969, Durrant became the first Victorian ward of the state to gain a bachelor's degree (Monash, BEc).

Related artists and associations 
In the mid 1970s: Durrant exhibited in New York with the American Realists Chuck Close, and Janet Fish.

See also 
 Art of Australia
 Asher Bilu and United Artist Galleries
 Chuck Close
 Janet Fish
 Georges Mora and Tolarno Galleries
 Mad Dog Morgan
 Johnny O'Keefe "Death and Legacy"
 Little band scene
 Sir John Sulman Prize
 List of Australian artists

Notes

References

 'Art Nation - Ivan Durrant - Video', ABC Arts, (1 Apr 2011) http://www.abc.net.au/arts/stories/s3180052.htm, viewed 10 Jan 2012.
 'Boundary Rider Exhibition', Ararat Rural City Council, (8 Nov 2010), https://web.archive.org/web/20150614205905/http://council-services.ararat.vic.gov.au/news/view/news/93-boundary-rider-exhibition, viewed 10 Jan 2012
 Coslovich, Gabriella, 'The politics of art', Arts - The Age Online, (14 May 2004), http://www.theage.com.au/articles/2004/05/13/1084289821310.html, viewed 10 Jan 2012.
 Desmond, Michael, 'Ivan DURRANT', SOFTSCULPTURE, National Gallery of Australia, http://nga.gov.au/Exhibition/SoftSculpture/Default.cfm?IRN=427&BioArtistIRN=17339&MnuID=3&ArtistIRN=17339&ViewID=2
 Durrant, Jacqui, (2011), 'Public understandings and private metaphor in Ivan Durrant's 'the cow', Art and Australia, Vol. 48/3.
 Gowing, Ben, 'Ivan Durrant', Brass and Gowing, (2011), https://web.archive.org/web/20160304001623/http://www.bengowing.com/09.html, viewed 10 Jan 2012.
 'Ivan Durrant', Radio National Night Club, (30 Jan 2002), http://www.abc.net.au/rn/legacy/programs/nclub/stories/s472748.htm, viewed 10 Jan 2012.
 'Ivan Durrant', Radio National Sunday Morning, (23 May 2004), http://www.abc.net.au/rn/legacy/programs/sunmorn/stories/s1113425.htm, viewed 10 Jan 2012.
 Rule, Dan, 'From unholy cows to horses for courses', Horse.com.au, (15 Feb 2011), https://web.archive.org/web/20150922073939/http://www.horse.com.au/horse-articles/2011/2/15/from-unholy-cows-to-horses-for-courses/, viewed 10 Jan 2012.
 Stephens Art - Representing Ivan Durrant, (n.d.), http://www.stephensart.com.au/index.html, viewed 10 Jan 2012.
 'The Great Shed Show by Ivan Durrant', Gallery 34, (2010), https://web.archive.org/web/20120519031352/http://gallery34.com.au/australian-shed-series-by-ivan-durrant/, viewed 10 Jan 2012.

External links 
 Ivan Durrant IMDb: https://www.imdb.com/name/nm2044015/
 Essentials Magazine: http://www.essentialsmagazine.com.au/
 Durrant's portrait titled "A Little Bit Louder Now" of Australian singer, Johnny O'Keefe hangs in the National Portrait Gallery, Canberra https://web.archive.org/web/20120206024122/http://www.portrait.gov.au/gallery/portmnth/december/hirez.htm
 National Portrait Gallery, Canberra, portrait of Chrissy Amphlett titled "Temperamental" 1989, by Ivan Durrant, http://www.portrait.gov.au/site/Chrissy_Amphlett.php
 Artist Bio and uploaded works - https://web.archive.org/web/20120129194354/http://www.terminartors.com/artistprofile/Durrant_Ivan

1947 births
Living people
Artists from Melbourne
Australian painters
Australian performance artists
Australian contemporary artists
People from Brighton, Victoria